Connie Lamb may refer to:

Connie Lamb of Lamb Air
Connie Lamb (singer) on The Voice UK (series 8)